The Mongolian Plateau is the part of the Central Asian Plateau lying between 37°46′-53°08′N and 87°40′-122°15′E and having an area of approximately . It is bounded by the Greater Hinggan Mountains in the east, the Yin Mountains to the south, the Altai Mountains to the west, and the Sayan and Khentii mountains to the north. The plateau includes the Gobi Desert as well as dry steppe regions. It has an elevation of roughly 1,000 to 1,500 meters, with the lowest point in Hulunbuir and the highest point in Altai.

Politically, the plateau spans all of Mongolia, along with parts of China and Russia. Inner Mongolia and parts of the Dzungarian basin in Xinjiang encompass the Chinese portion of the plateau. In Russia, the plateau forms Transbaikal, part of Buryatia, and the southern Irkutsk Oblast.

History 
The plateau was inhabited and conquered by various groups, including (chronologically) the Xiongnu, Xianbei, Göktürks, Tang dynasty, Liao dynasty, Mongol Empire, Yuan dynasty, Northern Yuan dynasty, and Qing dynasty.

Changing environment
Between 1980 and 2010, rising global temperatures and direct human activity (particularly the use of lake water for mining and agriculture) have contributed to a significant loss of lake surface area across the Plateau. Qagaan Nurr and XinKai Lake, have shrunk by two-thirds of their surface area during that time frame, while others (including Huangqihai Lake and Naiman Xihu) have dried up entirely. Some exceptions, such as East Juyan Lake and Had Paozi, have grown, but overall the average total surface area of lakes in the region has shrunk by 30%.

See also
Lop Nur
South Siberian Mountains
Taklamakan Desert
Tarim Basin

References

External links
 
 

Plateaus of China
Plateau
Plateaus of Russia
Landforms of Central Asia
Plateaus of Asia